Adrian Fletcher (born 10 October 1969) is a former Australian rules footballer and current assistant coach. He is regarded as one of football's nomads, having played for five Australian Football League clubs in his 13-year career. Fletcher's play relied on being an excellent play reader which resulted in him being a prolific possession gatherer, especially by handball.

Early career
Fletcher was recruited from the Tasmanian Football League (TFL) club Glenorchy with the 20th selection in the 1988 VFL draft by the Geelong Football Club after winning the William Leitch Medal as the best player in the TFL. He played 23 games for Geelong between 1989 and 1991, kicking 10 goals. Fletcher was traded to St Kilda in 1992, where he played 22 games, kicking 10 goals. Due to a contract dispute, he left the Saints and was selected by the Brisbane Bears with the 4th selection in the 1993 Pre-season draft.

Brisbane career

Fletcher made his name as a tough, ball-winning midfielder at Brisbane. Between 1993 and 1996, Fletcher played 86 of a possible 90 games, finishing in the top five of the club champion award in each year. He was a significant player in the Bears' 1996 preliminary final loss to North Melbourne playing on the half back line.

In 1997, however, his form slumped after the lack of a solid pre-season. He fought back, however, and ended up with a season average of 19 possessions per game in 21 games. However, despite a season that, although starting badly, was not considered by Fletcher to be his worst, he was traded to the Fremantle Dockers.

Fremantle career
Fletcher had an immediate impact at Fremantle, finishing second in the club's Best and Fairest award in 1998 and winning it in 1999. He was then named co-captain along with Shaun McManus in 2000 and 2001. At the end of the 2001 season he was asked to retire by the Fremantle club despite being ranked in the AFL's top 20 for overall disposals and also was in the AFL's top five for handballs. He played 79 games for the Dockers ending up with 25 goals.

While at Fremantle, Fletcher is remembered for being the player who kicked the ball to field umpire Peter Carey, when Carey famously and humorously took a chest mark in general play.

After Fremantle, Fletcher played for Williamstown in the VFL in 2002 and 2003, appearing in 41 games and booting 17 goals. He was best-on-ground in the 2003 VFL grand final victory by Williamstown over Box Hill at Princes Park and received the Norm Goss Medal, as well as winning the best and fairest award during his two years with the VFL Seagulls. He was assistant coach under Brad Gotch in 2002.

Statistics

|- style="background-color: #EAEAEA"
! scope="row" style="text-align:center" | 1989
|
| 4 || 8 || 5 || 1 || 76 || 53 || 129 || 22 || 4 || 0.6 || 0.1 || 9.5 || 6.6 || 16.1 || 2.8 || 0.5 || 0
|-
! scope="row" style="text-align:center" | 1990
|
| 4 || 9 || 3 || 2 || 106 || 93 || 199 || 23 || 11 || 0.3 || 0.2 || 11.8 || 10.3 || 22.1 || 2.6 || 1.2 || 1
|- style="background-color: #EAEAEA"
! scope="row" style="text-align:center" | 1991
|
| 4 || 6 || 2 || 0 || 68 || 62 || 130 || 19 || 10 || 0.3 || 0.0 || 11.3 || 10.3 || 21.7 || 3.2 || 1.7 || 0
|-
! scope="row" style="text-align:center" | 1992
|
| 16 || 22 || 10 || 7 || 231 || 223 || 454 || 73 || 38 || 0.5 || 0.3 || 10.5 || 10.1 || 20.6 || 3.3 || 1.7 || 5
|- style="background-color: #EAEAEA"
! scope="row" style="text-align:center" | 1993
|
| 6 || 20 || 15 || 6 || 236 || 235 || 471 || 87 || 41 || 0.8 || 0.3 || 11.8 || 11.8 || 23.6 || 4.4 || 2.1 || 4
|-
! scope="row" style="text-align:center" | 1994
|
| 6 || 19 || 5 || 5 || 236 || 213 || 449 || 68 || 35 || 0.3 || 0.3 || 12.4 || 11.2 || 23.6 || 3.6 || 1.8 || 6
|- style="background-color: #EAEAEA"
! scope="row" style="text-align:center" | 1995
|
| 6 || 23 || 14 || 11 || 319 || 294 || 613 || 96 || 49 || 0.6 || 0.5 || 13.9 || 12.8 || 26.7 || 4.2 || 2.1 || 7
|-
! scope="row" style="text-align:center" | 1996
|
| 6 || 24 || 15 || 17 || 341 || 239 || 580 || 90 || 61 || 0.6 || 0.7 || 14.2 || 10.0 || 24.2 || 3.8 || 2.5 || 14
|- style="background-color: #EAEAEA"
! scope="row" style="text-align:center" | 1997
|
| 6 || 21 || 4 || 10 || 238 || 172 || 410 || 84 || 59 || 0.2 || 0.5 || 11.3 || 8.2 || 19.5 || 4.0 || 2.8 || 8
|-
! scope="row" style="text-align:center" | 1998
|
| 2 || 16 || 8 || 6 || 225 || 142 || 367 || 68 || 40 || 0.5 || 0.4 || 14.1 || 8.9 || 22.9 || 4.3 || 2.5 || 3
|- style="background-color: #EAEAEA"
! scope="row" style="text-align:center" | 1999
|
| 2 || 22 || 9 || 5 || 298 || 283 || 581 || 105 || 38 || 0.4 || 0.2 || 13.5 || 12.9 || 26.4 || 4.8 || 1.7 || 15
|-
! scope="row" style="text-align:center" | 2000
|
| 2 || 20 || 4 || 2 || 215 || 220 || 435 || 67 || 53 || 0.2 || 0.1 || 10.8 || 11.0 || 21.8 || 3.4 || 2.7 || 10
|- style="background-color: #EAEAEA"
! scope="row" style="text-align:center" | 2001
|
| 2 || 21 || 3 || 5 || 230 || 250 || 480 || 97 || 54 || 0.1 || 0.2 || 11.0 || 11.9 || 22.9 || 4.6 || 2.6 || 3
|- class="sortbottom"
! colspan=3| Career
! 231
! 97
! 77
! 2819
! 2479
! 5298
! 899
! 493
! 0.4
! 0.3
! 12.2
! 10.7
! 22.9
! 3.9
! 2.1
! 76
|}

Post AFL and coaching career
After being delisted by Fremantle after the 2001 season and not being drafted by another AFL club, Fletcher retired from the AFL, and played for Williamstown Football Club in the VFL for two years. He won the Williamstown best and fairest award in both these seasons and also won the Norm Goss Medal for best on ground in the 2003 VFL grand final, Fletcher's last game of senior football. He also was a development coach for the Collingwood Football Club (Williamstown's AFL-affiliate) during this time.

In 2004, Fletcher joined the Geelong Football Club as an assistant coach, before returning to Collingwood in 2005 as their midfield coach. After the 2007 season he left Collingwood and returned to the Brisbane Lions as an assistant coach, where he remains as of 2011.

He has made several appearances in AFL Legends Matches. His wife, Narelle Fletcher, played 295 games in the Women's National Basketball League.

References

External links

1969 births
Living people
Australian rules footballers from Tasmania
Brisbane Bears players
Brisbane Lions players
Geelong Football Club players
St Kilda Football Club players
Fremantle Football Club players
Doig Medal winners
Williamstown Football Club players
William Leitch Medal winners
Glenorchy Football Club players
Tasmanian Football Hall of Fame inductees
Allies State of Origin players
Tasmanian State of Origin players
Fremantle Football Club captains